Aiden Bonar (born 8 March 1999) is a professional Australian rules footballer playing for the North Melbourne Football Club in the Australian Football League (AFL). He made his GWS debut in round 20 of the 2018 season scoring two goals in the 105 point win against Carlton at Docklands Stadium.

Aiden's mother was born and raised in Papua New Guinea and his Scottish father met her while working there.

He played junior football at Seaford Tigers and Haileybury.

Statistics
 Statistics are correct to the end of the 2019 season

|-
|- style="background-color: #EAEAEA"
! scope="row" style="text-align:center" | 2018
|
| 10 || 4 || 5 || 2 || 19 || 23 || 42 || 12 || 18 || 1.3 || 0.5 || 4.8 || 5.8 || 10.5 || 3.0 || 4.5
|-
! scope="row" style="text-align:center" | 2019
|
| 10 || 2 || 0 || 0 || 11 || 8 || 19 || 5 || 5 || 0.0 || 0.0 || 5.5 || 4.0 || 9.5 || 2.5 || 2.5
|- class="sortbottom"
! colspan=3| Career
! 6
! 5
! 2
! 30
! 31
! 61
! 17
! 23
! 0.8
! 0.3
! 5.0
! 5.2
! 10.2
! 2.8
! 3.8
|}

References

External links 

 
 

Living people
1999 births
People educated at Haileybury (Melbourne)
Dandenong Stingrays players
Greater Western Sydney Giants players
Australian rules footballers from Victoria (Australia)
Australian people of Papua New Guinean descent

North Melbourne Football Club players